The Palace of the Dukes of Cadaval is located in Évora historic centre, in Portugal, next-door to the Lóios Convent and Church (today a remarkable Pousada) and facing the Roman Temple of Évora.

It belongs to the Duke of Cadaval family, and today it has a harmonious architectural elements combination: Moorish (Mudéjar), Gothic and Manueline period. The palace with its 17th-century façade is constituted in part by an old castle burnt in 1384. Today it is dominated by a tower called Tower of the Five Shields.

This palace was used by the governor of the city of Évora and served, from time to time, as royal residence. The first-floor rooms house a collection manuscripts, family portraits and religious art from the 16th century, which can be visited by the public.

See also
Duke of Cadaval
Évora

Buildings and structures in Évora
Cadaval
Buildings and structures in Évora District
Tourist attractions in Évora District